Georg Philipp Harsdörffer (1 November 1607 – 17 September 1658) was a Jurist, Baroque-period German poet and translator.

Born in Nuremberg, he studied law at Altdorf and Strassburg. He studied at the University of Strassburg under professor Matthias Bernegger. He subsequently traveled through the Netherlands, England, France and Italy. While he was in Italy, he came into contact with members of learned academies. He shared his desire for reform in literary and linguistic for the improvement of moral and culture of the society.

His knowledge of languages earned him the appellation "the learned."  He was well-versed in contemporary French culture and literature. As an innovative poet, he was receptive to ideas from abroad. He is still known for his "Germanizations" of foreign-language terms. As a member of the Fruitbearing Society (Fruchtbringende Gesellschaft) he was called der Spielende (the player). In 1644 jointly with Johann Klaj he founded the order of the Pegnitzschäfer (Pegnitz Shepherds), a literary society, in Nuremberg. He was known by the name Strephon among the members of this order.

His writings in German and Latin fill fifty volumes, and a selection of his poems, which are mostly interesting for their form, can be found in Müller's Bibliothek deutscher Dichter des 17ten Jahrhunderts, vol. ix (Leipzig, 1826). Widmann (Altdorf, 1707) wrote a biography of him.

In his Treatise to Protect the Work on the German Language (1644), he asserted that German ‘speaks with the tongues of nature.'

He was the father of Karl Gottlieb Harsdörffer (1637–1708).

External links

References

  This work in turn cites:
 Julius Tittmann, Die Nürnberger Dichterschule (Göttingen, 1847)
 Hodermann, Eine vornehme Gesellschaft, nach Harsdörffers "Gesprächspielen" (Paderborn, 1890)
 T. Bischoff, "Georg Philipp Harsdörffer" in the Festschrift zur 1600 jahrigen Jubelfeier des Pegnesischen Blumenordens (Nuremberg, 1894)
 Krapp, Die asthetischen Tendenzen Harsdörffers (Berlin, 1904).
 S. Taussig, C. Zittel (éds.), Japeta. Édition et traduction, Brepols Publishers, 2010, 
 Stefan Manns, Grenzen des Erzählens. Konzeption und Struktur des Erzählens in Georg Philipp Harsdörffers "Schauplätzen". Berlin 2013 (= Deutsche Literatur. Studien und Quellen; 14);  (zugl. Univ. Dissertation, FU Berlin 2010).

1607 births
1658 deaths
German poets
Writers from Nuremberg
German male poets
German-language poets
Baroque writers